Cristiano "Kiko" Dinucci (born 5 July 1977) is a Brazilian singer-songwriter.

Career 
Born in São Paulo, Dinucci grew up in Guarulhos, where he was a member of several rock bands, including Personal Choice in the 1990s. In 2008 he released the samba-punk album Pastiche Nagô with Bando Afromacarrônico.

In 2011 he co-founded the groups Metá Metá, together with Juçara Marçal and Thiago França, and Passo Torto, with Romulo Fróes, Rodrigo Campos and Marcelo Cabral, later joined by Ná Ozzetti.

His first proper solo album Cortes Curtos was released in 2017 and consists of 15 short tracks - chronicling stories set in the city of São Paulo - exploring the sound of "samba sujo", with strong influences from rock, punk and post-punk. The album was voted the 21st best Brazilian album of 2017 by Rolling Stone Brasil magazine.

Discography 
 2007 - Padê (with Juçara Marçal)  
 2008 - Pastiche Nagô (with Bando Afromacarrônico)  
 2009 - O Retrato Do Artista Quando Pede (as Duo Moviola, with Douglas Germano)  
 2010 - Na Boca Dos Outros 
 2011 - Passo Torto (with Romulo Fróes, Rodrigo Campos e Marcelo Cabral)  
 2011 - Metá Metá (with Juçara Marçal e Thiago França)  
 2012 - MetaL MetaL (with Juçara Marçal e Thiago França)  
 2013 - Passo Elétrico (with Romulo Fróes, Rodrigo Campos e Marcelo Cabral)  
2013 - Thiago França (with Rômulo Fróes, Rodrigo Campos, Marcelo Cabral and Ná Ozzetti)  
2016 - MM3 (with Juçara Marçal e Thiago França)  
2017 -  Cortes Curtos  
2020 - Rastilho

References

External links  
 
 

 

1977 births
Living people 
21st-century Brazilian singers
Musicians from São Paulo
Brazilian male singer-songwriters